AA amyloidosis is a form of amyloidosis, a disease characterized by the abnormal deposition of fibers of insoluble protein in the extracellular space of various tissues and organs. In AA amyloidosis, the deposited protein is serum amyloid A protein (SAA), an acute-phase protein which is normally soluble and whose plasma concentration is highest during inflammation.

Causes 
AA amyloidosis is a complication of a number of inflammatory diseases and infections, although only a small portion of patients with these conditions will go on to develop AA amyloidosis. The most common presentation of AA amyloidosis is renal in nature, including proteinuria, nephrotic syndrome  and progressive development of chronic kidney disease leading to end stage kidney disease (ESKD) and need for renal replacement therapy (e.g. dialysis or kidney transplantation). A natural history study of AA amyloidosis patients reported a number of conditions associated with AA amyloidosis: 
 Autoimmune diseases
 Rheumatoid arthritis
 Ankylosing spondylitis
 Crohn disease and ulcerative colitis
 Chronic infections
 Tuberculosis
 Bronchiectasis
 Chronic osteomyelitis
 Autoinflammatory diseases
 Familial Mediterranean fever (FMF) 
 Muckle–Wells syndrome (MWS)
 Cancer
 Hodgkin's lymphoma
 Renal cell carcinoma
 Chronic foreign body reaction
 HIV/AIDS
 Silicone-induced granulomatous reaction

Symptoms 
Signs and symptoms of amyloidosis can vary depending on the affected organ. AA amyloidosis is commonly found in organs like the kidneys, liver, and stomach. If the kidneys are affected, an individual may see swelling in the legs, reduced urination, and at times excessive bubbles in the urine. Amyloid proteins in the kidneys can also lead to high cholesterol. Other organs like the stomach may result in bleeding, constipation, etc.

Pathology 
In a healthy individual, the median plasma concentration of SAA is 3 mg per liter. This can increase to over 2000 mg per liter during an acute phase response and a sustained overproduction of SAA is required for the creation of the AA deposits that define AA amyloidosis.  High levels of SAA, however, is not a sufficient condition for the development of systemic AA amyloidosis and it remains unclear what triggers the accumulation of AA.

The AA protein is mainly deposited in the liver, spleen and kidney, and AA amyloidosis can lead to nephrotic syndrome and ESRD. Natural history studies show, however, that it is the kidney involvement that drives the progression of the disease. In general, old age, reduced serum albumin concentration, end stage kidney failure, and sustained elevated SAA concentration are all associated with poor prognosis.

Diagnosis
Tissue biopsy using subcutaneous abdominal fat tissue aspiration is typically used as it is safe and sensitive. It is also possible to biopsy the rectal mucosa or minor salivary glands. Amyloidosis is confirmed by histological identification of amyloid deposits. At this point, amyloid typing with immunochemical staining is necessary, as the differential diagnosis includes AA amyloidosis, AL amyloidosis, hereditary amyloidosis, dialysis-related amyloidosis and age-related systemic amyloidosis. Testing of serum and urine for monoclonal immunoglobulins and of serum for free light chains may help rule out immunoglobulin light chain amyloidosis, while genetic testing may be used if hereditary amyloidosis is suspected.

Treatment

There are currently no approved treatments for systemic AA amyloidosis. The current standard of care includes treatments for the underlying inflammatory disease with anti-inflammatory drugs, immunosuppressive agents or biologics. AA amyloidosis patients are also receiving treatments to slow down the decline of their renal function, such as angiotensin II receptor blockers or angiotensin converting enzyme inhibitors.

Transmission of amyloidosis
There is evidence that eating amyloid fibers may lead to amyloidosis. This evidence is based on studies in cattle, chickens, mice, and cheetahs.  Thus, in a sense, SAA amyloidosis may be considered a contagious disease, although whether this occurs or is important in the development of naturally occurring amyloidosis remains unknown. Nevertheless, because amyloid fibers can be detected in muscle in low amounts, it raises some concern about whether people could develop amyloidosis as a result of ingesting meat from an animal with the disease.

References

External links 

 UK NHS National Amyloidosis Centre Patient Information Site: information on AA amyloidosis 

(www.AmyloidAware.com ) Booklet and explanatory video explaining the difference between the types of amyloidosis. Written by doctors at Mayo Clinic, Boston University, Indiana University and others

Amyloidosis